The Savage 10FP is a bolt-action sniper rifle manufactured by Savage Arms and based on the Savage Model 110 rifle.  There are seven variants of this rifle, each designated with an "LE" code signifying that it is part of the Law Enforcement Series. Most 10FP series rifles are configured with the AccuTrigger, matte-blued barreled action, heavy free-floating and button-rifled barrel, oversized bolt handle, internal box magazine (holding 4 rounds), and three swivel studs for sling and bipod mounting.

The Savage 10FP is similar to the Savage 110FP rifles and differ only in the action lengths and in the calibers used.  The 10FP is designated a "short action" meaning cartridges similar in length to the .308 Winchester, while the 110FP is considered a "long action" meaning cartridges similar in length to the .30-06 Springfield. Both are bolt-action, rotating bolt rifles, with dual-lug bolts and integral, non-detachable magazines, and both are available in left-handed models.

Trigger
The 10FP comes with the Savage Arms developed "Accutrigger".  This trigger is intended to give a shooter the flexibility to set trigger pull to individual preference without having to pay a gunsmith to adjust it. The trigger can be adjusted from 6.5 to 26 N (1.5 to 6 lbf).  Savage claims that even when adjusted to its lowest setting, the AccuTrigger is completely safe and cannot accidentally discharge during normal use from being jarred or dropped when maintained and adjusted as intended. The AccuTrigger offers a relatively short lock time of 1.6 milliseconds favoring accurate shooting.

Adjustment
Savage says adjustment of the AccuTrigger is a simple process. Removal of the stock is necessary where rotation of an adjustment spring is required.  This is accomplished utilizing the Savage supplied tool. The AccuTrigger has a single adjustment location and is designed so it cannot be adjusted below the minimum setting. This adjustment feature is yet another example of the built-in customization design of this rifle. Customization allows users to adjust the rifle to their own personal comforts and preferences which can equate to accuracy improvement.

Current models

See also
 Savage Model 110
 Savage Model 110 BA
 List of firearms

References

External links
 Review of the 10FPXP-HS
 AccuTrigger review by Dick Metcalf in Shooting Times
 Official Savage 10FP product page
 Official Savage 110FP product page

5.56×45mm NATO firearms
7.62×51mm NATO rifles
.338 Lapua Magnum rifles
Bolt-action rifles of the United States
Police weapons
Savage Arms
Sniper rifles of the United States